Margaret Brenda Vertue (born 6 April 1953) is a South African Anglican bishop. She is the second woman to be elected as a bishop of the Anglican Church of Southern Africa and of the whole African continent, as the diocesan bishop of the Anglican Diocese of False Bay.

Vertue was educated at the Convent of the Holy Family in Kimberley and studied at St Paul's Theological College, Grahamstown (now the College of the Transfiguration), at Stellenbosch University and at St Beuno's, North Wales. She was ordained as one of the first woman priests by Archbishop Desmond Tutu in September 1992. She was preceded by Merwyn Castle

She was elected Bishop of the Diocese of False Bay on 3 October 2012 by the Diocesan Elective Assembly and consecrated as Bishop on 19 January 2013 by the Most Reverend Thabo Makgoba, Archbishop of Cape Town.

References

Bibliography

External links 

  ACSA Website
  Diocesan website

1951 births
Living people
Women Anglican bishops
Anglican bishops of False Bay
21st-century Anglican Church of Southern Africa bishops
People from Kimberley, Northern Cape
College of the Transfiguration alumni